Hagarstown is an unincorporated community in Fayette County, Illinois, United States. Hagarstown has a post office with ZIP code 62247.

References

Unincorporated communities in Fayette County, Illinois
Unincorporated communities in Illinois